The Unified Field is the fifth studio album by IAMX.  On 19 October 2012 the album title was officially announced on IAMX's PledgeMusic page. On 22 January 2013 the album cover and track listing were revealed. The first track, "I Come With Knives" was featured on the first episode of the ABC show How to Get Away with Murder, and the track "The Unified Field" was featured briefly on episode three, as well as "Walk With The Noise" on episode nine.

Track listing
 All songs written by Chris Corner:

Charts

References

IAMX albums
2013 albums